Wayne Pai (14 October 1952 – July 2008) was a Taiwanese businessman.

Pai founded the Polaris Group (寶來集團), the second largest securities brokerage of Taiwan, and served as the chairman of the company. Pai was considered a successful businessperson, but was entangled in multiple scandals prior to his death. He disappeared in Penghu since 2 July 2008. The police found Pai's body and confirmed his death by suicide on the morning of 4 July 2008.

References

1952 births
2008 deaths
Taiwanese bankers
20th-century Taiwanese businesspeople
Taiwanese billionaires
National Chiao Tung University alumni
People from Penghu County
Suicides in Taiwan
2008 suicides